Blake Carlton Cullen (born 19 February 2002) is an English cricketer. He made his first-class debut on 22 August 2020, for Middlesex against Sussex, in the 2020 Bob Willis Trophy. Prior to his first-class debut, he was named in England's squad for the 2020 Under-19 Cricket World Cup. Cullen made his Twenty20 debut on 10 June 2021, for Middlesex in the 2021 T20 Blast.

In April 2022, he was bought by the London Spirit for the 2022 season of The Hundred.

References

External links
 

2002 births
Living people
English cricketers
Middlesex cricketers
Place of birth missing (living people)
London Spirit cricketers